Youssef Jawdat (born 8 August 1963) is a Saudi Arabian archer. He competed in the men's individual event at the 1984 Summer Olympics.

References

1963 births
Living people
Saudi Arabian male archers
Olympic archers of Saudi Arabia
Archers at the 1984 Summer Olympics
Place of birth missing (living people)
20th-century Saudi Arabian people